The 2019 FIBA 3x3 World Cup, hosted by the Netherlands, was an international 3x3 basketball event that featured separate competitions for men's and women's national teams. The tournament ran between 18 and 23 June 2019 in Amsterdam, North Holland.

Background
It was announced in February 2017 that the Netherlands would host the event and that the tournament would be held at Museumplein, one of Amsterdam's public squares. Tickets for the event went on sale in March 2019.

Medalists

Participating teams
The FIBA 3x3 Federation Ranking on 13 December 2018 was used as basis to determine the participating FIBA member associations. The hosts, the Netherlands, qualified automatically for both the men's and women's events, while the defending champions, Serbia for men's and Italy for women's, also qualified automatically. Thereafter, the next 15 teams in both the men's and women's tournaments qualified on the basis of the Federation Rankings.

Main tournaments

Men

Women

Individual contests

Dunk contest

Skills contest

 (1)
 (1)
 (1)
 (1)
 (1)
 (1)
 (1)
 (1)
 (1)
 (1)
 (1)
 (1)
 (1)
 (1)

Shoot-out contest

 (1)
 (2)
 (1)
 (2)
 (1)
 (1)
 (2)
 (1)
 (1)
 (1)
 (1)
 (2)
 (1)
 (2)
 (1)
 (2)
 (2)
 (1)
 (1)
 (1)
 (1)
 (2)
 (1)
 (1)
 (1)
 (1)
 (1)
 (1)
 (1)
 (1)

References

External links

 
2019
2018–19 in Dutch basketball
FIBA 3x3 World Cup
FIBA 3x3 World Cup
2019
Sports competitions in Amsterdam